Carvone is a member of a family of chemicals called terpenoids. Carvone is found naturally in many essential oils, but is most abundant in the oils from seeds of caraway (Carum carvi), spearmint (Mentha spicata), and dill.

Uses
Both carvones are used in the food and flavor industry.  R-(−)-Carvone is also used for air freshening products and, like many essential oils, oils containing carvones are used in aromatherapy and alternative medicine.  S-(+)-Carvone has shown a suppressant effect against high-fat diet induced weight gain in mice.

Food applications
As the compound most responsible for the flavor of caraway, dill and spearmint, carvone has been used for millennia in food.  Wrigley's Spearmint Gum and spearmint flavored Life Savers are major users of natural spearmint oil from Mentha spicata.  Caraway seed is extracted with alcohol to make the European drink Kümmel.

Agriculture
S-(+)-Carvone is also used to prevent premature sprouting of potatoes during storage, being marketed in the Netherlands for this purpose under the name Talent.

Insect control
R-(−)-Carvone has been approved by the U.S. Environmental Protection Agency for use as a mosquito repellent.

Organic synthesis
Carvone is available inexpensively in both enantiomerically pure forms, making it an attractive starting material for the asymmetric total synthesis of natural products.  For example, (S)-(+)-carvone was used to begin a 1998 synthesis of the terpenoid quassin:<ref>(a) Shing, T. K. M.; Jiang, Q; Mak, T. C. W. J. Org. Chem. 1998, 63, 2056-2057. (b) Shing, T. K. M.; Tang, Y. J. Chem. Soc. Perkin Trans. 1 1994, 1625.</ref>

Stereoisomerism and odor
Carvone forms two mirror image forms or enantiomers: R-(−)-carvone, or L-carvone, has a sweetish minty smell, like spearmint leaves. Its mirror image, S-(+)-carvone, or D-carvone, has a spicy aroma with notes of rye, like caraway seeds. The fact that the two enantiomers are perceived as smelling different is evidence that olfactory receptors must respond more strongly to one enantiomer than to the other. Not all enantiomers have distinguishable odors. Squirrel monkeys have also been found to be able to discriminate between carvone enantiomers.

The two forms are also referred to by their optical rotations of laevo (L) referring to R-(−)-carvone, and dextro (D) referring to S-(+)-carvone.

OccurrenceS-(+)-Carvone is the principal constituent (60–70%) of the oil from caraway seeds (Carum carvi), which is produced on a scale of about 10 tonnes per year.  It also occurs to the extent of about 40–60% in dill seed oil (from Anethum graveolens), and also in mandarin orange peel oil. R-(−)-Carvone is also the most abundant compound in the essential oil from several species of mint, particularly spearmint oil (Mentha spicata), which is composed of 50–80% R-(−)-carvone.  Spearmint is a major source of naturally produced R-(−)-carvone.  However, the majority of R-(−)-carvone used in commercial applications is synthesized from R-(+)-limonene. The R-(−)-carvone isomer also occurs in kuromoji oil. Some oils, like gingergrass oil, contain a mixture of both enantiomers. Many other natural oils, for example peppermint oil, contain trace quantities of carvones.

History
Caraway was used for medicinal purposes by the ancient Romans, but carvone was probably not isolated as a pure compound until Franz Varrentrapp (1815–1877) obtained it in 1849.Handwörterbuch der reinen und angewandten Chemie [Concise dictionary of pure and applied chemistry] (Braunschweig, (Germany):  Friedrich Vieweg und Sohn, 1849), vol. 4, pages 686-688.  [Notes:  (1) Varrentrapp purified carvone by mixing oil of caraway with alcohol that had been saturated with hydrogen sulfide and ammonia; the reaction produced a crystalline precipitate, from which carvone could be recovered by adding potassium hydroxide in alcohol to the precipitate, and then adding water; (2) Varrentrapp's empirical formula for carvone is incorrect because chemists at that time used the wrong atomic masses for the elements; e.g., carbon (6 instead of 12).]  It was originally called carvol by Schweizer.  Goldschmidt and Zürrer identified it as a ketone related to limonene, and the structure was finally elucidated by Georg Wagner (1849–1903) in 1894.

Preparation
The dextro-form, S-(+)-carvone is obtained practically pure by the fractional distillation of caraway oil. The levo-form obtained from the oils containing it usually requires additional treatment to produce high purity R-(−)-carvone. This can be achieved by the formation of an addition compound with hydrogen sulfide, from which carvone may be regenerated by treatment with potassium hydroxide in ethanol and then distilling the product in a current of steam. Carvone may be synthetically prepared from limonene via limonene nitrosochloride which may be formed by treatment of limonene with isoamyl nitrite in glacial acetic acid. This compound is then converted into carvoxime, which can be achieved by refluxing with DMF in isopropanol. Refluxing  carvoxime with 5% oxalic acid yields carvone. This procedure affords R-(−)-carvone from R-(+)-limonene.  The major use of d-limonene is as a precursor to S-(+)-carvone.  The large scale availability of orange rinds, a byproduct in the production of orange juice, has made limonene cheaply available, and synthetic carvone correspondingly inexpensively prepared.

The biosynthesis of carvone is by oxidation of limonene.

Chemical properties

Reduction
There are three double bonds in carvone capable of reduction; the product of reduction depends on the reagents and conditions used.  Catalytic hydrogenation of carvone (1) can give either carvomenthol (2) or carvomenthone (3).  Zinc and acetic acid reduce carvone to give dihydrocarvone (4).  MPV reduction using propan-2-ol and aluminium isopropoxide effects reduction of the carbonyl group only to provide carveol (5); a combination of sodium borohydride and CeCl3 (Luche reduction) is also effective. Hydrazine and potassium hydroxide give limonene (6) via a Wolff–Kishner reduction.

Oxidation
Oxidation of carvone can also lead to a variety of products.  In the presence of an alkali such as Ba(OH)2, carvone is oxidised by air or oxygen to give the diketone 7.  With hydrogen peroxide the epoxide 8 is formed. Carvone may be cleaved using ozone followed by steam, giving dilactone 9, while KMnO4 gives 10.

Conjugate additions
As an α,β;-unsaturated ketone, carvone undergoes conjugate additions of nucleophiles.  For example, carvone reacts with lithium dimethylcuprate to place a methyl group trans to the isopropenyl group with good stereoselectivity.  The resulting enolate can then be allylated using allyl bromide to give ketone 11.

Metabolism
In the body, in vivo studies indicate that both enantiomers of carvone are mainly metabolized into dihydrocarvonic acid, carvonic acid and uroterpenolone.  (–)-Carveol is also formed as a minor product via reduction by NADPH. (+)-Carvone is likewise converted to (+)-carveol. This mainly occurs in the liver and involves cytochrome P450 oxidase and (+)-trans-carveol dehydrogenase.

References

External links
 Carvone at The Periodic Table of Videos'' (University of Nottingham)

Flavors
Enones
Monoterpenes
Cyclohexenes
Isopropenyl compounds